Mount Misery  or Misery Mountain may refer to:

Summits

Australia
 Mount Misery (Queensland), on the boundary of Canungra and Biddadaba, Scenic Rim Region
 Mount Misery, South Australia, in the Mount Lofty Ranges; see 
 Mount Misery (Tasmania)
 Mount Misery, at the boundary of the Wathaurong territory in Victoria 
 An early, unofficial name for the Sydney suburb Mount Pritchard, New South Wales
 Mount Misery, near Biddaddaba, Queensland

New Zealand
 Mount Misery (Two Thumb Range), a peak in the Two Thumb Range in the Canterbury Region of the South Island; see South Opuha River
 Mount Misery, in The Silverpeaks northwest of Dunedin in the South Island
 Mount Misery, near Owaka in the Otago Region of the South Island

United States
 Mount Misery, a rocky hill on the Pachaug Trail, Connecticut 
 Mount Misery, a hill in the town of Auburn, New Hampshire
 Mount Misery, or Valley Forge Mountain, in Tredyffrin Township, Pennsylvania
 Mount Misery (Lincoln, Massachusetts), on the Bay Circuit Trail near Boston, Massachusetts
 Misery Mountain (Taconic Mountains), a mountain located in New York and Massachusetts

Elsewhere
 Mount Misery, in Country Harbour, Nova Scotia, Canada
 Mount Misery in Gibraltar had Mount Misery Battery on it
 Mount Misery, a former name of Mount Liamuiga on the island of Saint Kitts

Other locations
 Pinelands Center at Mount Misery, or simply Mount Misery, a Methodist retreat center and camping site in the Pine Barrens of New Jersey, USA
 Mount Misery Brook, a brook near the retreat center

Other uses
 "Mount Misery", a song by The Zephyrs from their 2001 album When the Sky Comes Down It Comes Down on Your Head
 Mount Misery, a rock face in South Co. Kilkenny overlooking Waterford City
 "Mount Misery", an episode of the Canadian animated television series Jimmy Two-Shoes
 "Misery Mountain", nickname for the Federal Correctional Institution, Hazelton in West Virginia